Barbara Bogaev is an American radio journalist noted for her work as the host of the public radio documentary program Soundprint.

Early life 
She graduated cum laude with a degree in comparative literature from Silliman College, Yale University in 1983.

Career
Bogaev has done television work for PBS affiliates, CBS, and Nickelodeon.

She was co-host of the former American Public Media program, Weekend America, from 2004 through 2006. On December 5, 2006, a memo was circulated at Weekend America announcing that Bogaev would be leaving the show. On December 9, 2006, the show's co-host, Bill Radke, announced Bogaev's departure with no specifics given regarding her or the program. Weekend America last aired on January 31, 2009.

Bogaev was substitute host of the National Public Radio program, Fresh Air with Terry Gross.

She was a guest host of Marketplace Weekend, from American Public Media 2013—2014.

She is one of the hosts of the Shakespeare Unlimited podcast series, produced by the Folger Shakespeare Library.

Bogaev guest hosts the news and culture magazine shows "To The Point" and "Press Play" on KCRW, Santa Monica.

SOUNDPRINT
Peabody-Award-winning SOUNDPRINT® Media Center, Inc. published stories from January 1988 to July 2012, from Laurel, Maryland

SOUNDPRINT, founded at WJHU, first broadcast in January, 1988, with Bill Siemering as executive producer, funded by the Corporation for Public Broadcasting, National Endowment for the Arts, and the American Radio Program Fund

Moira Rankin was president of  Soundprint Media Center, an independent nonprofit carried on NPR’s satellite radio channel. Lisa Simeone, a freelancer on SOUNDPRINT, was fired, 19 October 2011, for her involvement in the Occupy movement.

References

Year of birth missing (living people)
Living people
American radio journalists
NPR personalities
Yale University alumni